A-40174 (SP-1) is an analgesic drug which acts as a potent cannabinoid receptor agonist, and was developed by Abbott Laboratories in the 1970s.

See also 
 A-41988
 Menabitan

References 

Cannabinoids
Benzopyrans
Propargyl compounds
Phenols